The following is a list of events affecting Canadian television in 1977. Events listed include television show debuts, finales, cancellations, and channel launches.

Events

Debuts

Ending this year

Television shows

1950s
Country Canada (1954–2007)
CBC News Magazine (1952–1981)
Circle 8 Ranch (1955–1978)
The Friendly Giant (1958–1985)
Hockey Night in Canada (1952–present)
The National (1954–present)
Front Page Challenge (1957–1995)
Wayne and Shuster Show (1958–1989)

1960s
CTV National News (1961–present)
Land and Sea (1964–present)
Man Alive (1967–2000)
Mr. Dressup (1967–1996)
The Nature of Things (1960–present, scientific documentary series)
Question Period (1967–present, news program)
Reach for the Top (1961–1985)
Take 30 (1962–1983)
The Tommy Hunter Show (1965–1992)
University of the Air (1966–1983)
W-FIVE (1966–present, newsmagazine program)

1970s
The Beachcombers (1972–1990)
The Bobby Vinton Show (1975–1978)
Canada AM (1972–present, news program)
City Lights (1973–1989)
Celebrity Cooks (1975–1984)
Coming Up Rosie (1975–1978)
Definition (1974–1989)
the fifth estate (1975–present, newsmagazine program)
A Gift To Last (1976–1979)
Grand Old Country (1975–1981)
Headline Hunters (1972–1983)
King of Kensington (1975–1980)
Let's Go (1976–1984)
Marketplace (1972–present, newsmagazine program)
Ombudsman (1974–1980)
Science Magazine (1975–1979)
Second City Television (1976–1984)
Sidestreet (1975–1978)
This Land (1970–1982)
V.I.P. (1973–1983)
The Watson Report (1975–1981)

TV movies
Ada
Dreamspeaker
Hank
The Machine Age
Maria
The Prophet from Pugwash
Someday Soon...
The Tar Sands

Television stations

Debuts

Closures

See also
 1977 in Canada
 List of Canadian films

References